Telestes metohiensis is a species of ray-finned fish in the family Cyprinidae.
It is found in Bosnia and Herzegovina and Croatia.
Its natural habitats are freshwater springs and inland karsts.
It is threatened by habitat loss.

References

Sources
 

Telestes
Freshwater fish of Europe
Fish described in 1901
Taxonomy articles created by Polbot
Endemic fauna of the Balkans
Endemic fish of the Neretva basin